Sex comedy, erotic comedy or more broadly sexual comedy is a genre in which comedy is motivated by sexual situations and love affairs. Although "sex comedy" is primarily a description of dramatic forms such as theatre and film, literary works such as those of Ovid and Geoffrey Chaucer may be considered sex comedies.

Sex comedy was popular in 17th century English Restoration theatre. From 1953 to 1965, Hollywood released a number of sex comedies, some featuring stars such as Doris Day, Jack Lemmon and Marilyn Monroe. The United Kingdom released a spate of sex comedies in the 1970s, notably the Carry On series. Hollywood released Animal House in 1978, which was followed by a long line of teen sex comedies in the early 1980s, e.g. Porky's, Bachelor Party and Risky Business. Other countries with a significant sex comedy film production include Brazil (pornochanchada), Italy and Mexico (sexicomedias).

Antiquity
Although the ancient Greek theatre genre of the satyr play contained farcical sex, perhaps the best-known ancient comedy motivated by sexual gamesmanship is Aristophanes' Lysistrata (411 BC), in which the title character persuades her fellow women of Greece to protest the Peloponnesian War by withholding sex. The "boy-meets-girl" plot that is distinctive of Western sexual comedy can be traced to Menander (343–291 BC), who differs from Aristophanes in focusing on the courtship and marital dilemmas of the middle classes rather than social and political satire.

His successor Plautus, the Roman playwright whose comedies inspired the musical A Funny Thing Happened on the Way to the Forum, regularly based his plots on sexual situations. The popularity of Plautus's comedies was a major influence on the creation of situation sex comedy.

Restoration sex comedy

During the decade 1672–82, sex comedy such as The Country Wife (1675) flourished as part of the revival of theatre in England resulting from the Restoration. Forerunners of the craze were John Dryden's An Evening's Love (1668) and Thomas Betterton's The Amorous Widow (ca. 1670). Sexual content was favored by the presence of female performers, in contrast to the drag performances of the Elizabethan stage. The main character was often a self-important rake or libertine, posturing heroically. Adultery was a major theme, and the couple is sometimes found in flagrante delicto, represented by the stage direction "in disorder." The plays are often characterized by sexually charged banter, "swaggering masculine energy," and a superficially innocent heroine who is nonetheless alluring. This theatrical milieu produced the first woman of the Western tradition who made her living as playwright, Aphra Behn (The Rover).

Sex comedy embraces a realm of drama in which women can be contenders. The war is fought with glances and flirtations, wit and beauty, manipulation and desire. And in this battle, women often win—even if the victory is sometimes equivocal.

Presenting seduction and adultery as funny eased moral anxieties that might otherwise have attached to these themes. It is an open question as to whether the plays portraying libertinism endorse the lifestyle, or hold it up to satire and criticism.

After the main vogue of Restoration sex comedy, William Congreve revived and reinvented the form, and bawdy comedy remained popular into the 18th century.

Modern sex comedy

American sex comedy

Film historian Tamar Jeffers McDonald highlights the period 1953 to 1965 as an era where sex comedy came to be the main form of romantic comedy in Hollywood.  She claims that 1953 was a key year as the producers of the film The Moon Is Blue challenged the Motion Picture Production Code rules against using the word 'virgin', Hugh Hefner introduced Playboy magazine, and sexologist Alfred Kinsey drew attention to the way women were having sex before marriage. In the movies, playboys played by actors such as Rock Hudson or Tony Curtis would try to bed marriage-minded women played by actresses such as Doris Day or Marilyn Monroe, and the central question would seem to be "will she or won't she?", but in the end, the man would fall for the "girl", and sometimes agree to marry her. Notable sex comedies in this period were Some Like It Hot, The Apartment, Irma La Douce, Pillow Talk, The Seven Year Itch, Gentlemen Prefer Blondes and Lover Come Back. According to McDonald, by 1965, the sexual revolution was under way, so "will she or won't she?" could no longer serve as the central dynamic, and filmmakers moved on to different topics.

Some may also consider the 1967 film, The Graduate, to be a sex comedy due to the story being about the main character, Benjamin Braddock, being seduced and starting an affair with his family friends' mother, Mrs. Robinson. During the 70's, there were films such as Pretty Maids All in a Row, The Chicken Chronicles, The Swinging Cheerleaders, The Pom Pom Girls, and Cooley High which share some to many elements from the sex comedy sub-genre. The sub-genre sometimes shares genre elements with the coming-of-age stories genre as well.

In 1978, National Lampoon's Animal House success led to a string of raunchy gross-out and sex comedies in the late 1970s and early to mid 1980s. Animal House featured many scenes that would become iconic and often parodied, such as the scene where John "Bluto" Blutarsky (John Belushi) acts as a "peeping tom" to spy on a half-naked pillow fight at a sorority. In 1981, the film Porky's cemented the wide appeal of the sex comedy. Although it would go on to become the fifth highest-grossing film of the year, it proved to be unpopular with critics, with many accusing it of being degrading to women as well as objectifying of them. The film would lead to three sequels and is credited by many as the start of the "teen" subgenre of the sex comedy. Some other examples of these types of films from this era and some of which have actors/actresses starring in them that later went on to bigger fame include Revenge of the Nerds, Hot Dog…The Movie, The Last American Virgin, Losin' It, Risky Business, Mischief, Bachelor Party, Once Bitten, Fast Times at Ridgemont High, Secret Admirer, The Sure Thing, Class, Private Lessons, Private School,  and Private Resort.

Another 80's teen comedy film that stars young actors and actresses that went onto bigger fame and is tamer on its handling of sex is Little Darlings.

Although not widely considered a "sex comedy," the 1998 critical and financial hit There's Something About Mary has many moments that have entered the pop culture lexicon, particularly the infamous scene in which Ted Stroehmann (Ben Stiller), following a scene of vigorous masturbation, discovers that his semen is hanging off of his ear. Mary (Cameron Diaz), mistaking it for hair gel, nonchalantly grabs it and runs it through her hair.

A year later, the film American Pie was credited with reviving the "teen sex comedy" subgenre. In the film, a group of high schoolers make a pact to lose their virginity before they graduate. The film's most famous scene (which also provides its namesake) involves one of the high schoolers, Jim (Jason Biggs), having intercourse with a fresh apple pie after being told by a friend that it is similar to "getting to third base." The film spawned numerous sequels and spin-off films, all with varying degrees of financial and critical success, and kicked off a second wave of American sex comedy in the late 1990s and early 2000s.

A third wave of American sex comedy emerged in the mid to late 2000s and into the early 2010s with a string of successful sex comedy films by Judd Apatow and his associates. Apatow's 2005 directorial debut The 40-Year-Old Virgin follows Andy Stitzer (Steve Carell) as he struggles with the pressures of reaching the age of 40 without ever having "done the deed." Although the film featured crude sexual humor, it was critically praised for balancing it with an underlying romantic message. Another Judd Apatow related film, Superbad, shared many similar motifs from classic "teen" sex comedies of the past.

Sex comedies of the 2010s include The To Do List, puberty-themed series Big Mouth, and Yes, God, Yes.

British sex comedy

According to David McGillivray in his history of the British sex film, Doing Rude Things, Mary Had a Little... (1961) was the first British sex comedy. Bridging the gap between documentary nudist films and the later sex comedies was the film The Naked World of Harrison Marks (1965). George Harrison Marks' love of music hall and slapstick found its way into this spoof documentary biopic.

Norman Wisdom's last starring role, What's Good for the Goose (1969), was a sex comedy made by Tony Tenser. He specialised in producing exploitation films and founded his own production company Tigon British Film Productions in 1966. In the movie, he leaves his wife and kids to go off on a business trip and has an affair with a young girl, played by Sally Geeson
There apparently are two versions of the film: the 98-minute cut version was released in the UK, while the uncensored version (105 minutes) which shows nudity from Sally Geeson, was released in continental Europe.

Percy was directed by Ralph Thomas and starred Hywel Bennett, Denholm Elliott, Elke Sommer, and Britt Ekland. The film is about a successful penis transplant. An innocent and shy young man (Bennett) whose penis is mutilated in an accident and has to be amputated wakes up after an operation to find out that it has been replaced by a womanizer's, which is very large. The rest of the movie is about its new owner following in his predecessor's footsteps and meeting all the women who are able to recognize it. There was a sequel, Percy's Progress, released in 1974.

To move with the times, the Carry On series added nudity to its saucy seaside postcard innuendo. Series producer Peter Rogers saw the George Segal movie Loving (1970) and added his two favourite words to the title, making Carry On Loving (1970) the twentieth in the series.  Starring "countess of cleavage" Imogen Hassall, the story of a dating agency service is still very innocent stuff. It was followed by Carry On Girls (1973), based around a Miss World-style beauty contest. Next in the series was Carry On Dick (1974), with more risqué humour and Sid James and Barbara Windsor's on- and off-screen lovemaking.

It has often been noted that historically, a defining characteristic of most British sex comedies – particularly in the period after the censorship rules were relaxed slightly at the turn of the 1970s – is that they were "neither sexy nor funny".

The Confessions series
The Confessions series consisted of four sex comedy films released during the 1970s starring Robin Askwith. The films in the Confessions series—Confessions of a Window Cleaner, Confessions of a Driving Instructor, Confessions of a Pop Performer, and Confessions from a Holiday Camp—concern the erotic adventures of Timothy Lea and are based on the novels of Christopher Wood, writing as Timothy Lea.

Soon came Adventures of..., directed by Stanley Long, which started with Adventures of a Taxi Driver, starring sitcom star Barry Evans, and was followed by Adventures of a Private Eye and Adventures of a Plumber's Mate, starring future record producer Christopher Neil. Long began his career as a photographer before producing striptease shorts (or "glamour home movies", as they were sometimes known), for the 8 mm market. Beginning in the late fifties, Long's feature film career would span the entire history of the British sex film, and as such exemplifies its differing trends and attitudes. His work ranges from coy nudist films (Nudist Memories 1959), to moralizing documentary (The Wife Swappers, 1970) to a more relaxed attitude to permissive material (Naughty!, 1971) to out and out comedies at the end of the 1970s. He did not like sex scenes and was dismissive of pornography, saying it did not turn him on and he turned his back when such scenes were being filmed.

Carry Ons become sexy

British sex comedy films became mainstream with the release in 1976 of Carry On England, starring Judy Geeson, Patrick Mower, and Diane Langton, in which an experimental mixed-sex anti-aircraft battery in wartime is enjoying making love not war. However, the arrival of the new Captain S. Melly brings an end to their cosy life and causes terror in the ranks.

In Carry On Emmannuelle, the beautiful Emmannuelle Prevert just cannot get her own husband into bed. A spoof of Emmanuelle, the film revolves around the eponymous heroine (Suzanne Danielle) and her unsuccessful attempts to make love to her husband, Emile (Kenneth Williams), a French ambassador. Emile grants Emmannuelle permission to sleep with anyone she likes, and her promiscuity turns her into a celebrity and a frequent talk show guest. Meanwhile, Theodore Valentine is besotted by her and wants them to get married. But Emmannuelle is obsessed with arousing her husband's sexual desire at almost any cost. This was the last of the original Carry On films.

Sleaze and sexploitation

Producer/director Kenneth F. Rowles made a copycat cash-in with his The Ups and Downs of a Handyman. His next movie, Take an Easy Ride, purports to be a public information film warning of the dangers of hitchhiking but is actually a sexploitation film showing young girls being sexually assaulted and murdered (although Rowles says he had to add those scenes on request of the movie's distributor).

Films like Dreams of Thirteen, The Younger the Better, Geilermanns Töchter - Wenn Mädchen mündig werden, Erika's Hot Summer, Mrs. Stone's Thing, and Come Play With Me played in Soho and elsewhere, but with the arrival of the Margaret Thatcher government in 1979 the Eady Levy was abolished in 1985, killing off the genre.

French sex comedy
Some French coming of age films contain many themes of the modern "sex comedy" genre, such as Murmur of the Heart.

Italian sex comedy

The commedia sexy all'italiana (lit. "sex comedy Italian style"), also known as commedia scollacciata or commedia erotica all'italiana, is a subgenre of Italian commedia all'italiana film genre. It is characterized typically by both abundant female nudity and comedy, and by the minimal weight given to social criticism that was instead basic in the commedia all'italiana main genre.

Indian sex comedy
Since the 2010s, many Indian films and TV shows have been made in the sex comedy genre. There was initially a hesitant reaction to them but this was followed by gradual acceptance. Examples of the genre include Vicky Donor, Mastizaade, the Masti film series, The Shaukeens, the Pyaar Ka Punchnama film series, the Kyaa Kool Hai Hum film series, Guddu Ki Gun, and the Four More Shots Please! streaming TV show. Widely available and affordable Internet connections have been available in India since 2016, and this combined with affordable over-the-top media services have contributed to increased production of the genre. However, the conservative political and social culture that has been prevalent in the country since 2014 has been very critical of sex comedies. Sexual films and TV shows in general are subject to far more intense attacks on social media in India than are seen in other countries. Despite such criticisms the rate of sex comedy production has not slowed.

Japanese sex comedy
In Japanese, sexy movies or TV shows tend to be referred to as 'oiroke' お色気 which might be translated as 'with a tinge of colour.' 'Pink films' ピンク映画 are more narrowly sexy films made by independent studios for release to adult theatres. The traditional word for comedy is 'kigeki' 喜劇. It was applied to Kyōgen, short comic plays performed in theatres. The word 'kigeki' is also used in the titles of some movies from the 1960s, but more recently the loan word 'komedi' コメディ　has become the usual way of referring to humorous films or TV shows.

In 1959, director Kon Ichikawa produced an adaptation of Junichirō Tanizaki's novel The Key titled Odd Obsession wherein a man whose powers are failing finds he can restore his vigor by spying on his daughter and her fiancé, so he hatches a scheme to involve his wife. Yasuzo Masumura's 1964 film adaptation of Junichirō Tanizaki's novel Quicksand(Manji) took a tongue-in-cheek approach to the melodrama of a housewife falling in love with a younger woman. Shohei Imamura released The Pornographers in 1966, parodying the workings of a small pornographic film company.

In 1970–1, Yuji Tanno and Isao Hayashi directed a number of movies based on Go Nagai's manga Harenchi Gakuen.  Go Nagai's Kekkou Kamen manga has also been adapted into a movie and several Original Videos. Norifumi Suzuki has directed a number of sex comedies: Ero Shogun to Juuichinin no Aishou (The Erotic Shogun and his 11 Concubines 1972), Onsen Mimizu Geisha (Hot Springs Worm Geisha 1972), Onsen Suppon Geisha (Hot Springs Turtle Geisha 1972) all for big budget studio Toei as well as the teen sex comedy Pantsu no Ana (Hole in her Panties 1984).

Yoshimitsu Morita has directed a number of racey comedies including Something Like It (No You na Mono) (1981), Hot Stripper (Maru Hon Uwasa no Sutorippaa)(1982) and 24 Hour Playboy (Ai to Heisei no Iro Otoko) (1989). Director Juzo Itami's films such as The Funeral, Tampopo and A Taxing Woman are comedies principally about non-sexual topics, but all have a side story that deals with sex, and features nudity. Takeshi Kitano's Getting Any? movie is about the quest for sex. Nikkatsu's Roman Porno series was usually fairly serious, but Morita's Love Hard Love Deep and manga adaptation Minna Agechau were Roman Pornos, and other films in the series such as Pink Tush Girl and Abnormal Family: Older Brother's Bride have been described as comedies.

Recently there has been a spate of sexy coming of age comedies, e.g. Haruka Ayase's Oppai Volleyball and live action adaptations of the manga Tokyo Daigaku Monogatari, Ibitsu, Moteki and Recently, My Sister Is Unusual.

The 2003 Japanese TV drama Stand Up! starring Kazunari Ninomiya is the story of four virgin boys, and bears some resemblance to American sex comedies of the 1980s.

See also
Ribaldry
Penis jokes
 Ecchi
 :Category:Sex comedy television series
 :Category:British sex comedy films

References

Further reading
 McDonald, Tamar Jeffers. 2007. Romantic Comedy: Boy Meets Girl Meets Genre. Wallflower Press
 McDonald, Tamar Jeffers, ed. 2010. Virgin Territory: Representing Sexual Inexperience in Film. Wayne State University Press.
 Sheridan, Simon. 2011. Keeping the British End Up: Four Decades of Saucy Cinema. Titan Books. 4th edition.

 
Comedy films by genre
Erotic films by genre
Stand-up comedy